Dix Mille Matins is an album recorded by Daniel Boucher between November 1998 and August 1999. It was originally released in 1999. Dix Mille Matins is the first album released by Daniel Boucher. Two years prior to this album, Daniel Boucher was already proclaimed as the end of decade's revelation in Quebec as he won the "Festival en chanson de Petite-Vallée" (Gaspésie). In 2000, he won at the "l'adisq" for this album. The album was certified Gold by the CRIA in July 2002.

Track listing 
All tracks by Daniel Boucher except where noted.

 "La Désise" – 4:56
 "Aidez-moi" – 4:14
 "Un inconnu" – 4:53
 "Ma croûte" – 1:22
 "Silicone" – 3:40
 "Délire" – 4:17
 "Boules à mites" – 5:43
 "Ça" – 2:59
 "Le Poète des temps gris" (Boucher, Eric DeSève, Daniel Grégoire, Jonathan Ménard) – 4:55
 "Deviens-tu c'que t'as voulu?" – 4:51
 "Le Nombril du monde" – 7:14

Personnel 
Frédéric Beauséjour – arranger, bass
Réjean Bouchard – arranger, bas
Daniel Boucher – guitar, arranger, voices
Guy Dubuc – arranger, clavier
Daniel Hubert – arranger, bass
Jean Charles Labarre – concept graphics
Marc Lessard – percussion, arranger, drums
Marc Pérusse – guitar, arranger, realization
Paul Picard – percussion

Year-end charts

References 

1999 debut albums
Daniel Boucher (musician) albums